.home is an ICANN rejected generic top-level domain proposed in 2012.  The ICANN Board issued a resolution on February 4, 2018 to cease the processing of all applications for the .corp, .home, and .mail gTLDs.

Technical concerns 
Investigation into the conflicts regarding gTLDs that are in use in internal networks was conducted at ICANN's request by Interisle Consulting.  The resulting report was to become known as the Name Collision issue, which was first reported at ICANN 47.

See also 
 Top Level Domain
 Generic top-level domain
 .corp rejected gTLD
 .mail rejected gTLD

References

External links 
 .home ICANN Wiki

Proposed top-level domains
Rejected proposed top-level domains